In mathematics, and in particular in mathematical analysis, the Gagliardo–Nirenberg interpolation inequality is a result in the theory of Sobolev spaces that relates the -norms of different weak derivatives of a function through an interpolation inequality. The theorem is of particular importance in the framework of elliptic partial differential equations and was originally formulated by Emilio Gagliardo and Louis Nirenberg in 1958. The Gagliardo-Nirenberg inequality has found numerous applications in the investigation of nonlinear partial differential equations, and has been generalized to fractional Sobolev spaces by Haim Brezis and Petru Mironescu in the late 2010s.

History 
The Gagliardo-Nirenberg inequality was originally proposed by Emilio Gagliardo and Louis Nirenberg in two independent contributions during the International Congress of Mathematicians held in Edinburgh from August 14, 1958 through August 21, 1958.  In the following year, both authors improved their results and published them independently. Nonetheless, a complete proof of the inequality went missing in the literature for a long time. Indeed, to some extent, both original works of Gagliardo and Nirenberg do not contain a full and rigorous argument proving the result. For example, Nirenberg firstly included the inequality in a collection of lectures given in Pisa from September 1 to September 10, 1958. The transcription of the lectures was later published in 1959, and the author explicitly states only the main steps of the proof. On the other hand, the proof of Gagliardo did not yield the result in full generality, i.e. for all possible values of the parameters appearing in the statement. A detailed proof in the whole Euclidean space was published in 2021.   

From its original formulation, several mathematicians worked on proving and generalizing Gagliardo-Nirenberg type inequalities. The Italian mathematician Carlo Miranda developed a first generalization in 1963, which was addressed and refined by Nirenberg later in 1966. The investigation of Gagliardo-Nirenberg type inequalities continued in the following decades. For instance, a careful study on negative exponents has been carried out extending the work of Nirenberg in 2018, while Brezis and Mironescu characterized in full generality the embeddings between Sobolev spaces extending the inequality to fractional orders.

Statement of the inequality 

Both families of spaces are intended to be endowed with their standard norms, namely:
where  stands for essential supremum. Above, for the sake of convenience, the same notation is used for scalar, vector and tensor-valued Lebesgue and Sobolev spaces.

The original version of the theorem, for functions defined on the whole Euclidean space , can be stated as follows.

Notice that the parameter  is determined uniquely by all the other ones and usually assumed to be finite.

Relevant corollaries of the Gagliardo-Nirenberg inequality 
The Gagliardo-Nirenberg inequality generalizes a collection of well-known results in the field of functional analysis. Indeed, given a suitable choice of the seven parameters appearing in the statement of the theorem, one obtains several useful and recurring inequalities in the theory of partial differential equations:

 The Sobolev embedding theorem establishes the existence of continuous embeddings between Sobolev spaces with different orders of differentiation and/or integrability. It can be obtained from the Gagliardo-Nirenberg inequality setting  (so that the choice of  becomes irrelevant, and the same goes for the associated requirement ) and the remaining parameters in such a way that and the other hypotheses are satisfied. The result reads then for any  such that .
 The Ladyzhenskaya inequality is a special case of the Gagliardo-Nirenberg inequality. In three space dimensions, a slightly different choice of parameters is needed, namelyyieldingfor any . Here, it holds .
 The Nash inequality, which was published by John Nash in 1958, is yet another result generalized by the Gagliardo-Nirenberg inequality. Indeed, choosingone gets which is oftentimes recast asor its squared version.

Proof of the Gagliardo-Nirenberg inequality 
A complete and detailed proof of the Gagliardo-Nirenberg inequality has been missing in literature for a long time since its first statements. Indeed, both original works of Gagliardo and Nirenberg lacked some details, or even presented only the main steps of the proof. 

The most delicate point concerns the limiting case . In order to avoid the two exceptional cases, we further assume that  is finite and that , so in particular . The core of the proof is based on two proofs by induction.

A double induction argument is applied to the couple of integers , representing the orders of differentiation. The other parameters are constructed in such a way that they comply with the hypotheses of the theorem. Here, in order for the inequality to hold, the remaining parameters should satisfy 
The first induction step goes as follows. To this end, the remaining parameters  necessarily satisfy 
Fix them as such. Then, let  be such that 
From the base case, we can infer that 
Now, from the two relations between the parameters, through some algebraic manipulations we arrive at 
therefore the inequality with  applied to  implies 
The two inequalities imply the sought Gagliardo-Nirenberg inequality, namely 
The second induction step is similar, but allows  to change. Again, fix the parameters  in such a way that 
and let  be such that 
The proof is completed by combining the two inequalities. In order to prove the base case, several technical lemmas are necessary, while the remaining values of  can be recovered by interpolation and a proof can be found, for instance, in the original work of Nirenberg.

The Gagliardo-Nirenberg inequality in bounded domains 
In many problems coming from the theory of partial differential equations, one has to deal with functions whose domain is not the whole Euclidean space , but rather some given bounded, open and connected set  In the following, we also assume that  has finite Lebesgue measure and satisfies the cone condition (among those are the widely used Lipschitz domains). Both Gagliardo and Nirenberg found out that their theorem could be extended to this case adding a penalization term to the right hand side. Precisely,

The necessity of a different formulation with respect to the case  is rather straightforward to prove. It can be easily seen that the Gagliardo-Nirenberg inequality for the case  fails to be true for any nonzero constant function, since a contradiction is immediately achieved, and therefore cannot hold in general for integrable functions defined on bounded domains.

That being said, under slightly stronger assumptions, it is possible to recast the theorem in such a way that the penalization term is "absorbed" in the first term at right hand side. Indeed, if , then one can choose  and get This formulation has the advantage of recovering the structure of the theorem in the full Euclidean space, with the only caution that the Sobolev seminorm is replaced by the full -norm. For this reason, the Gagliardo-Nirenberg inequality in bounded domains is commonly stated in this way.

Finally, observe that the first exceptional case appearing in the statement of the Gagliardo-Nirenberg inequality for the whole space is no longer relevant in bounded domains, since for finite measure sets we have that  for any finite

Generalization to non-integer orders 

The problem of interpolating different Sobolev spaces has been solved in full generality by Haïm Brezis and Petru Mironescu in two works dated 2018 and 2019. Here,  is either the full space, a half-space or a bounded and Lipschitz domain. In this definition, there is the understanding that , so that the usual Sobolev spaces are recovered whenever  is a positive integer. These spaces are often referred to as fractional Sobolev spaces. A generalization of the Gagliardo-Nirenberg inequality to these spaces reads
For example, the parameter choice gives the estimate The validity of the estimate is granted, for instance, from the fact that .

See also 
Metric (mathematics)
Functional analysis
Function space

References 

Theorems in functional analysis
Inequalities
Sobolev spaces